The A26 road is a primary route in the southeast of England, going from Maidstone to Newhaven through the counties of Kent and East Sussex. The road is almost entirely single carriageway with one lane on each side, although some of the road is three lanes, with the middle lane switching sides for overtaking and right turns.

As consequence, it has a large Heavy Goods Vehicle usage.

History 
The A26 was originally classified in 1922 due to the Ministry of Transport Act 1919, which in section 19 instructed the classification of all major roads. The original route went from Maidstone to Brighton, along part of what is now the A27. The part of the road going from Lewes was later reclassified to the A27 between 1947 and 1951. The road was later extended along the B2109 to Newhaven after 1969.

Route

Maidstone to Tonbridge 
The road starts as a non-primary route at a gyratory with the A20, in Maidstone, and then heads west to the A228, through Barming, Barming Heath, Teston, Wateringbury, and Mereworth where it becomes a primary route.

It then turns southwest towards Tonbridge and shares the route of the A228 until the next roundabout with Seven Mile Lane. The A26 passes through Hadlow and the edge of Tonbridge. Since 1970 it has formed an eastern bypass of Tonbridge town centre, which terminates at the Vauxhall roundabout where there are slip roads to the A21 dual carriageway. From this roundabout the A2014 Pembury Road runs into Tonbridge. The A26 route resumes at the west end of Pembury Road and heads south as Quarry Hill, forming a second grade-separated junction with the A21.

Tonbridge to Maresfield 
South of Tonbride the A26 passes through Bidborough, Southborough, Royal Tunbridge Wells, Eridge Green, and Boarshead. The road then passes through Crowborough, going past the B2100, and then goes towards Maresfield, where it is interrupted by the A22.

Ridgewood to Newhaven 
Again heading south-west, the road meets with the A2029 in Lewes after passing Little Horsted, and leaves Lewes heading south via Cuilfail Tunnel until it is interrupted again, this time by the A27.

After a short stretch of road where it is merged with the A27 it heads south, ending on the A259 in Newhaven, after passing Tarring Neville and South Heighton.

Distinguishing features 
When entering Lewes from the direction of Uckfield, one is met with a view of the chalk cliffs at the very edge of the South Downs. Following this you will enter the Cuilfail Tunnel, constructed in 1983, which leaves at the roundabout The Culfail Spiral, a sculpture created by Peter Randall-Page.

Junctions 
{| class="plainrowheaders wikitable"
|-
!scope=col|County
!scope=col|Location
!scope=col|mi
!scope=col|km
!scope=col|Coord
!scope=col|Destinations
!scope=col|Notes
|-
|rowspan="13"|Kent
|Maidstone
|0
|0
|
| - Maidstone, Ditton
|
|-
|rowspan="3"|—
|3.4
|5.4
|
|B2163 - West Farleigh, Coxheath
|
|-
|4.3
|6.9
|
|B2015 - East Peckham
|
|-
|6.6
|10.6
|
| - Kings Hill, East Peckham B2016 - Wrotham Heath
|
|-
|rowspan="5"|Tonbridge
|14.4
|23.2
|
|B2017 - Tudeley
|
|-
|15
|24
| bgcolor="ddffdd" |
| bgcolor="ddffdd" |  - Hastings, Sevenoaks  - Tonbridge
| bgcolor="ddffdd" |Continues as A2014
|-
|colspan="5" bgcolor="ddffdd" align="center"|concurrency with the A2014
|-
|15.7
|25.3
| bgcolor="ddffdd" |
| bgcolor="ddffdd" | - Junction with A21B2260 - Tonbridge
| bgcolor="ddffdd" |Continues from A2014
|-
|16.4
|26.4
| bgcolor="ffdddd" |
| bgcolor="ffdddd" |  - Sevenoaks, London
| bgcolor="ffdddd" |No eastbound entry to A21 or westbound exit from A21
|-
|rowspan="4"|Royal Tunbridge Wells
|17.3
|27.8
|
|B2176 - Penshurst
|
|-
|20.1
|32.3
|
|  - Langton Green, Pembury
|
|-
|20.5
|33.0
|
|B2023 - Royal Tunbridge Wells
|
|-
|25.6
|33.1
|
|  - Frant
|
|-
|rowspan="12"|East Sussex
|Crowborough
|27.2
|43.7
|
|B2100 - Rotherfield
|
|-
|rowspan="2"|—
|33.4
|53.8
|
|  - Buxted
|
|-
|33.8
|54.4
| bgcolor="ddffdd" |
| bgcolor="ddffdd" |  - East Grinstead
| bgcolor="ddffdd" |Continues as A22
|-
|rowspan="2"|Uckfield
|colspan="5" bgcolor="ddffdd" align="center"|concurrency with the A22
|-
|36.6
|58.9
| bgcolor="ddffdd" |
| bgcolor="ddffdd" |  - Hailsham
| bgcolor="ddffdd" |Continues from A22
|-
|rowspan="3"|Lewes
|42.5
|68.4
|
|B2192 - Rotherfield
|
|-
|43.2
|69.5
|
|  - Lewes
|
|-
|44.0
|70.9
| bgcolor="ddffdd" |
| bgcolor="ddffdd" |  - Brighton, Worthing
| bgcolor="ddffdd" |Continues as A27
|-
|rowspan="2"|—
|colspan="5" bgcolor="ddffdd" align="center"|concurrency with the A27
|-
|45.5
|73.2
| bgcolor="ddffdd" |
| bgcolor="ddffdd" |  - Eastbourne
| bgcolor="ddffdd" |Continues from A27
|-
|rowspan="2"|Newhaven
|49.9
|80.3
|
|B2109 - Newhaven
|
|-
|50.6
|81.4
|
|  - Peacehaven, Seaford
|
|-

*Ceremonial Counties
Coordinate list

References

External links 

Roads in England
Transport in East Sussex
Roads in Kent
Road tunnels in England